Mark Heard is the first solo album by Mark Heard, originally released in 1975, and re-released as On Turning to Dust on both AB Records and Solid Rock Records in 1978.

A limited edition CDR reissue of the original Mark Heard album was released to fans in 1998 through Fingerprint Records.

Track listing
All songs written by Mark Heard, except "Cabin in Gloryland" by O. A. Parris, writer /Cpl. Curtis Stewart. "Greensleeves interlude" is a 16th-century English melody. "There is a Fountain" is an early American melody, words by William Cowper, 1771. "Passion Chorale" is by Hans Leo Hassler, 1601; harmony by J. S. Bach, 1729, words by Bernard of Clairvaux, 11th century. "Dinner at Grandma's" - by Mark Heard, Pat Terry, Jeff Vansant, Wayne King.

Side one
 "On Turning to Dust"
 "Dinner at Grandma's"
 "Cabin in Gloryland"
 "A Friend"
 "Lullabye"

Side two
 "Solid Rock"
 "To Diane"
 "Interlude (traditional: Greensleeves & There Is a Fountain)"
 "The Road"
 "Interlude (Traditional: Passion Chorale)"
 "All"

The band

 Mark Heard – guitars, vocals, piano, synthesizer and hambone
 Earl Grigsby – bass guitar
 Frank Godby – banjo
 John Heinrich – pedal steel guitar
 Chuck Long – sandblocks
 Jim Pennington – percussion
 Dave Aldrich – string arrangement
 Lamay String Quartet – string section

Production notes
 Cecil Jones – engineer
 Mark and Janet Sue Heard – photography and cover design
 Lemco Studios, Lexington, Kentucky – recording location

References 

1975 albums
Mark Heard albums